The Nemours Foundation is a non-profit organization in Jacksonville, Florida, created through the last will and testament of philanthropist Alfred I. du Pont by his widow Jessie Ball duPont in 1936, and dedicated to improving the health of children. The Foundation operates Nemours Children’s Health, among America’s largest multi-state, multi-hospital health systems dedicated solely to the health and well-being of children. The Nemours Children’s model of health includes pediatric clinical care, research, medical education, policy, prevention and population health.

The clinical practice consists of two free-standing children’s hospitals, Nemours Children’s Hospital, Delaware in Wilmington, Delaware and Nemours Children’s Hospital, Florida in Orlando’s Medical City Lake Nona, more than 70 Nemours Children’s specialty, urgent and primary care practices in Delaware, Florida, Pennsylvania and New Jersey, and direct-to-consumer pediatric urgent care via its Nemours App telehealth. Its children’s health media arm features KidsHealth.org, which provides doctor-approved information about the health, behavior, and development of children from birth to adulthood, KidsHealth in the Classroom health curriculum for elementary, middle and high school educators, and KidsHealth patient instructions and KidsHealth GetWell Network licensed by providers across the U.S.

The Nemours Mansion and Gardens in Wilmington, Delaware is also owned and operated by the Nemours Foundation.

The foundation is the primary beneficiary of the Alfred I. duPont Testamentary Trust, which had a value over $5 billion in 2015. Du Pont's will stipulated that the trust make an annual disbursement of an amount equal to 3% of the trust's value.

References

External links
Nemours Foundation official website
Alfred I. duPont Testamentary Trust website
KidsHealth website

Non-profit organizations based in Jacksonville, Florida
1936 establishments in Florida
Organizations established in 1936
Alfred I. du Pont
Medical and health foundations in the United States
Healthcare in Jacksonville, Florida